The BPOE Lodge: Golden Block, also referred to as Golden Square, was a building in Grand Forks, North Dakota that was listed on the National Register of Historic Places, but was removed from the National Register in 2004.

Also known as Golden Block, the Benevolent and Protective Order of Elks clubhouse was built c. 1910.  It was designed by Joseph Bell DeRemer.  It included Early Commercial, Vernacular, and other architecture.

Along with Wright Block, the Telephone Co. Building, the Dinnie Block, and Clifford Annex, the Golden Block was one of many "commercial vernacular brick buildings with classical revival details" that were built during a major building boom, with high quality brickwork.

References

Former National Register of Historic Places in North Dakota
Buildings designated early commercial in the National Register of Historic Places in North Dakota
Vernacular architecture in North Dakota
Buildings and structures completed in 1910
Joseph Bell DeRemer buildings
National Register of Historic Places in Grand Forks, North Dakota
Clubhouses on the National Register of Historic Places in North Dakota
Elks buildings
Buildings and structures destroyed by flooding
1997 disestablishments in North Dakota
1910 establishments in North Dakota